Abu Fukayha (c.540–c.620) was the kunya of Yasar, a companion of the Islamic prophet Muhammad. Three verses of the Quran were revealed about a situation that concerned him.

Biography

Abu Fukayha was ancestrally from the Azd tribe in Yemen. He was a slave in Mecca in the possession of Safwan ibn Umayya ibn Muharrith of the Kinana tribe. His master manumitted him at an unknown date; but his social status in the city remained "insignificant".

He had one son, Abu Tajra, and two daughters, Fukayha and Baraka. 
Abu Tajra became the mawla of the Abdaldar clan and in his turn had two daughters, Barra and Habiba.
Baraka was a mawla of Abu Sufyan. She married Qays in Abdallah, a member of the Asad tribe and an ally of Sa'id ibn al-'As ibn Umayya. They had one daughter, Umayya.
Fukayha married Hattab ibn al-Harith from the Juma clan.
Baraka and Fukayha were among the Muslims who migrated to Abyssinia, together with Safwan ibn Umayya's daughter Fatima. 

The aged Abu Fukayha became a Muslim. He suffered under the persecution of 614-616, when he was tortured until he did not know what he was saying. Muhammad said that a Muslim who denied his faith under such circumstances, yet "whose heart remains at rest in its faith," was not to blame.

Abu Fukayha and other poor men used to sit in the Kaaba with Muhammad. The Quraysh used to jeer at Muhammad for consorting with humble people, saying: "These are his companions, as you see. Is it such creatures that God has chosen from among us to give guidance and truth? If what Muhammad has brought were a good thing these fellows would not have been the first to get it, and God would not have put them before us." Muhammad produced this prophecy in response.

Abu Fukayha is not mentioned among those who emigrated to Medina in 622. It is likely that he had died of natural causes by this date.

Historical Note

It is popularly believed that Abu Fukayha was bought and manumitted by Abu Bakr. This is not correct. His name does not appear on Ibn Ishaq's list of slaves bought by Abu Bakr, which professes to be complete. Rather, Ibn Ishaq expressly states that it was Abu Fukayha's original master, Safwan, who freed him.

References

Companions of the Prophet